Toldish Tunnel was built by Joseph Treffry as part of his mineral tramway from Newquay (Newquay to St. Dennis) which opened in 1849. This line was built to carry trams. In 1874 the line was taken over by the Cornwall Minerals Railway and the line from Newquay was extended to Par railway station. At this time the line from Newquay to Par was converted to standard gauge which was needed for the larger passenger carrying trains. It was not viable to widen the tunnel, so in 1874 it was bypassed and closed. The new line missing out the Toldish tunnel section was opened on 1 June 1874.

Current condition
The arch at the western entrance of the Toldish tunnel has been partially bricked up and the cutting is now flooded. The tunnel is still shown as a disused railway and runs east-west from grid reference SW 924601 to SW 920599. The eastern entrance is overgrown but looks to be in good condition.

See also

Atlantic Coast Line, Cornwall
West Cornwall Mineral Railways  (February 2005) by Maurice Dart

References

Tunnels in Cornwall
Rail transport in Cornwall
Railway tunnels in England
Tunnels completed in 1849
1849 establishments in England
Industrial archaeological sites in Cornwall